Coldwater is a city in Branch County, Michigan, United States. As of the 2020 census, the city population was 13,822.  It is the county seat of Branch County, located in the center of the southern border of Michigan. The city is surrounded by Coldwater Township, but is administratively autonomous.

History
American settlers did not move into the area until around 1830, with many arriving from New York and New England. Coldwater was incorporated as a village in 1837, and then incorporated by the legislature as a city in 1861. It was designated in 1842 as the county seat of Branch County.

Geography
The Coldwater River flows into the city from the south, originating from Coldwater Lake.  The Coldwater chain of lakes also has an outlet called the Sauk River, which flows from its north end (near Quincy) and then through the south side of the city of Coldwater.  Both combine to form a series of shallow, connected lakes on the city's west side.

Climate
National Weather Service records show that average January temperatures are a maximum of 28.9 °F and a minimum of 14.3 °F.  Average July temperatures are a maximum of 81.4 °F and a minimum of 59.9 °F.  There are an average of 8.5 days with highs of 90 °F (32 °C) or higher and an average of 145.2 days with lows of 32 °F (0 °C) or lower.  The record high temperature of 115 °F was on July 12, 2011, and the record low temperature was -23 °F on January 4, 1981.

Precipitation averages 35.66 inches annually.  There is measurable precipitation on an average of 142.1 days.  The wettest year was 1905 with 46.12 inches and the driest year was 1930 with 18.01 inches.  The most precipitation in one month was 10.90 in May 1989.  The most precipitation in 24 hours was 5.37 inches on June 26, 1978.

Coldwater has a climate that is borderline between categories Dfa (hot summer) and Dfb (long, warm summer) in the Köppen climate classification.

Snowfall averages 54.5 inches annually.  There is measurable snowfall on an average of 34.6 days.  The snowiest season was 1977-78 when 84.8 inches fell, including 50.7 inches in January 1978.  A blizzard that month included 17.0 inches of snow on January 26, 1978.

Demographics

2010 census
As of the census of 2010, there were 10,945 people, 4,255 households, and 2,628 families living in the city. The racial makeup of the city was 92.5% White, 0.6% African American, 0.2% Native American, 0.8% Asian, 3.2% from other races, and 2.7% from two or more races. Hispanic or Latino of any race were 6.6% of the population.

There were 4,255 households, of which 34.9% had children under the age of 18 living with them, 39.9% were married couples living together, 15.1% had a female householder with no husband present, 6.7% had a male householder with no wife present, and 38.2% were non-families. 32.4% of all households were made up of individuals, and 14.6% had someone living alone who was 65 years of age or older. The average household size was 2.49 and the average family size was 3.14.

The median age in the city was 35.2 years. 27.2% of residents were under the age of 18; 9.3% were between the ages of 18 and 24; 25.3% were from 25 to 44; 23.4% were from 45 to 64; and 15% were 65 years of age or older. The gender makeup of the city was 47.8% male and 52.2% female.

2000 census
As of the census of 2000, there were 12,697 people, 4,058 households, and 2,520 families living in the city. The racial makeup of the city was 85.35% White, 8.42% African American, 0.75% Native American, 0.92% Asian, 0.03% Pacific Islander, 1.52% from other races, and 3.01% from two or more races. Hispanic or Latino of any race were 4.52% of the population.

There were 4,058 households, out of which 32.9% had children under the age of 18 living with them, 43.6% were married couples living together, 12.9% had a female householder with no husband present, and 37.9% were non-families. 31.9% of all households were made up of individuals, and 13.9% had someone living alone who was 65 years of age or older.  The average household size was 2.49 and the average family size was 3.11.

In the city, the population was spread out, with 22.4% under the age of 18, 9.4% from 18 to 24, 35.4% from 25 to 44, 20.3% from 45 to 64, and 12.5% who were 65 years of age or older.  The median age was 36 years. For every 100 females, there were 101.5 males.  For every 100 females age 18 and over, there were 100.8 males.

The median income for a household in the city was $33,913, and the median income for a family was $41,107. Males had a median income of $31,577 versus $22,088 for females. The per capita income for the city was $15,833.  About 6.0% of families and 9.6% of the population were below the poverty line, including 11.6% of those under age 18 and 7.9% of those age 65 or over.

Arts and culture

Annual cultural events
Several seasonal annual festivals are held in Coldwater. The Ice Festival held in January features ice carvings, a chili-tasting competition, and other family activities. The Strawberry fest held in June features many different foods made from strawberries and arts and crafts. The Apple Fest held in September features home-baked goods made from apples and various arts and crafts.

Tourism
The Tibbits Opera House in Coldwater was built in 1882; it is the second-oldest theater in Michigan. It was converted to a movie theater in the 1930s. In the 1960s a campaign began to restore its original use as a theater for live performances with the eventual goal of restoring its French Empire architecture. It is now a venue for a variety of cultural activities.

The Wing House was built in 1875; it is now operated as a historical museum by the Branch County Historical Society. The Little River Railroad offers rides behind a 1911-built steam locomotive, departing from the city's historic 1883 depot.

Education

 Coldwater Community Schools, public school district for Coldwater
 Pansophia Academy, charter school, grades K-12
 St. Charles Borromeo Catholic School, grades K-5
 Legg Middle School, grades 6-8. Part of Coldwater Community Schools.
 Branch Area Career Center, vocational training to high school students
 Coldwater High School, grades 9-12. Part of Coldwater Community Schools.
Aside from the usual public and parochial schools, Coldwater has a branch of Kellogg Community College and Baker College.

Media
The newspaper published in Coldwater is The Daily Reporter.

Coldwater has radio stations WTVB and WNWN, whose studios are located south of town on Business Loop 69 that are part of the Kalamazoo radio area. There are no television stations broadcasting from within the county; Coldwater gets its television signals from the Kalamazoo-Grand Rapids-Battle Creek and Lansing-Jackson SMSAs in Michigan.

Infrastructure

Transportation

Air
Memorial Airport serves general aviation only.

Major highways
. Coldwater is accessible from exits 10 (BL I-69, Fenn Road), 13 (US 12/BL I-69), and 16 (Jonesville Road). The city has expanded since 1967 when I-69 was completed in the area to incorporate the urban sprawl at exit 13.
 runs through downtown Coldwater.
 continues west to Sturgis and east toward the Hillsdale area.
 runs west to Three Rivers.

Mass transit
Coldwater public bus transportation is provided by Branch Area Transit Authority (BATA).

Rail
Coldwater has an east-west railroad, but this is essentially a relic of one that led to Chicago and Detroit.

Notable people

 Scott Brayton, Indycar driver, was killed in practice at the Indianapolis Motor Speedway in 1996
 Enoch Chase, Wisconsin State Senator
 George Coe, 11th Lieutenant Governor of Michigan 
 Hawley Harvey Crippen, convicted of murdering his wife and executed
 Jim Curtiss, professional baseball player
 Robert Dowdell, actor
 Edward Ellis, actor
 Samuel Etheridge, one of Michigan's first state senators, representing the Seventh Senatorial District from 1838-1840
 Jad Fair and David Fair, musicians; founders of the band Half Japanese
 Maude Farris-Luse (1887-2002), supercentenarian
 Alice Haylett, AAGPBL All-Star pitcher
 Bertha Lincoln Heustis, writer, born in Coldwater
 Jeff Kellogg, former MLB umpire
 Becky Levi, mixed martial artist
 Cyrus G. Luce, Michigan governor
 Ruth McDevitt, actress
 Alfred Milnes, mayor of Coldwater and 28th Lieutenant Governor of Michigan
 Clara D. Pierson, children's book author
 Harriet Quimby, aviation pioneer, the first US woman to receive a pilot's license
 Dan Severn, mixed martial artist and professional wrestler
 Jeff Stanton, motorcycle racer
 Bill Welke, current MLB umpire
 Tim Welke, former MLB umpire

Sister cities
  Soltau, Germany

See also
Battery "L" 1st Regiment Michigan Light Artillery
Coldwater Downtown Historic District
Marshall Street Historic District (Coldwater, Michigan)
East Chicago Street Historic District
First Presbyterian Church (Coldwater, Michigan)
South Monroe Street Historic District

References

External links

 City of Coldwater official website
 Coldwater Country Conference & Visitors Bureau
 Coldwater Downtown Development Authority
  Branch Area Career Center
 Coldwater Community Schools

	

 
Cities in Branch County, Michigan
County seats in Michigan
Micropolitan areas of Michigan
Populated places established in 1861
1861 establishments in Michigan